Middleburgh is the name of some settlements in New York, United States:
 Middleburgh (town), New York, in Schoharie County
 Middleburgh (village), New York, also in Schoharie County